"Superwoman" is a song recorded by American singer-songwriter Alicia Keys for her third studio album As I Am (2007). Written by Keys, Linda Perry, and Steve Mostyn, it was released as the fourth and final single from As I Am on July 29, 2008, by J Records.

Critically acclaimed, "Superwoman" earned Keys her second consecutive Grammy Award for Best Female R&B Vocal Performance, at the 2009 ceremony, and was also nominated for Outstanding Music Video and Outstanding Song at the 40th NAACP Image Awards.

Song information
Keys stated in an interview with MTV that "Superwoman" is her favorite track of the album, saying: "Every time I sing it, it makes me feel inspired to be however I am that day." "Superwoman" is also the opening song on the WNBA games which features a video of Keys performing the song in one of her concerts along with shot of women playing in the WNBA. The song debuted in the U.S. on the Hot R&B/Hip-Hop Songs chart week of August 14, 2008, at number fifty-five, eventually peaking at number twelve. Keys performed the song with Queen Latifah and Kathleen Battle at the 2008 American Music Awards on November 23.

Music video
The music video for "Superwoman" was filmed on June 9–10, 2008 at Quixote Studios and Center Studios in Los Angeles. It was directed by Chris Robinson, who had previously worked on other videos with Keys, like her MTV Video Music Award-winning video "Karma" and her previous single "Teenage Love Affair".

Keys plays many roles of women at their best strength and effort. Throughout the course of the video, she embodies a young mother applying for a university, an African woman, a businesswoman, a Cleopatra-like pharaoh, and an astronaut. Jada Pinkett Smith was also in the video, along with her son Jaden. The music video premiered exclusively on July 15, 2008 on Keys' official website. It was ranked number seventy-one on BET's Notarized: Top 100 Videos of 2008.

Track listings
US promotional CD single
 "Superwoman" (Radio Edit) – 4:04
 "Superwoman" (Call Out Hook) – 0:10

European / Australian CD single
 "Superwoman" (Radio Version) – 4:04
 "Superwoman" (Live Version) – 4:02

European CD Maxi-single
 "Superwoman" (Radio Version) – 4:04
 "Superwoman" (Live) – 4:02
 "Teenage Love Affair" (Part II) (featuring LL Cool J) – 4:11
 "Superwoman" (Video)

Credits and personnel

Musicians

Alicia Keys – vocals, piano, Fender Rhodes, Wurlitzer, Mellotron, Moog, bass synthesizer, virtual synthesizers
Mark Batson – Hammond B3, Moog bass
Steve Mostyn – bass guitar
Trevor Lawrence Jr. – live drums
Mark Robohm – live drums
Jumaane Smith – trumpet lead

Duane Eubanks – trumpet #2
Ryan Keberle – tenor trombone
Michael Dease – tenor trombone, bass trombone
David Watson – tenor saxophone
Darryl Dixon – alto saxophone
Carl Maraghi – baritone saxophone
Jason Sugata – French horn

Production

Alicia Keys – producer, horn arrangements
Kerry "Krucial" Brothers – producer, drum programming
Ray Chew – horn arrangements
Ann Mincieli – engineer
Stuart White – assistant engineer

Zach Hancock – assistant engineer
Seth Waldmann – assistant engineer
Seamus Tyson – assistant engineer
Manny Marroquin – mixing
Jared Robbins – mix assistant

Charts

Weekly charts

Year-end charts

Certifications

Release history

References

2000s ballads
2007 songs
2008 singles
Alicia Keys songs
Contemporary R&B ballads
Music videos directed by Chris Robinson (director)
Songs with feminist themes
Songs written by Alicia Keys
Songs written by Linda Perry
Song recordings produced by Alicia Keys